Seiner Majestät UB-4 was a German Type UB I submarine (U-boat) in the German Imperial Navy during World War I. She was sunk by a British Q-ship disguised as a fishing smack in August 1915.

UB-4 was ordered in October 1914 and was laid down at the Germaniawerft shipyard in Kiel in November. She carried two torpedoes for her two bow torpedo tubes and was also armed with a deck-mounted machine gun. UB-4 was broken into sections and shipped by rail to Antwerp for reassembly. She was launched and commissioned as SM UB-4 in March 1915.

UB-4 conducted the first sortie of the Flanders Flotilla in April, during which she sank the Belgian Relief ship , the first ship credited to the flotilla. She sank three more ships from mid-April to mid-August. On 15 August, UB-4 surfaced near the British Q-ship  and was sunk by gunfire from the sailing vessel. None of UB-4s 14 crewmen survived the attack.

Design and construction 
After the German Army's rapid advance along the North Sea coast in the earliest stages of World War I, the German Imperial Navy found itself without suitable submarines that could be operated in the narrow and shallow environment off Flanders. Project 34, a design effort begun in mid-August 1914, produced the Type UB I design: a small submarine that could be shipped by rail to a port of operations and quickly assembled. UB-4 was part of the initial allotment of eight submarines—numbered  to —ordered on 15 October from Germaniawerft of Kiel, just shy of two months after planning for the class began.

UB-4 was laid down by Germaniawerft in Kiel on 3 November. She had a single  Daimler 4-cylinder diesel engine for surface travel, and a single  Siemens-Schuckert electric motor for underwater travel, both attached to a single propeller shaft.

UB-4 was armed with two  torpedoes in two bow torpedo tubes. She was also outfitted for a single  machine gun on deck. UB-4s standard complement consisted of one officer and thirteen enlisted men.

After work on UB-4 was complete at the Germaniwerft yard, UB-4 was readied for rail shipment. The process of shipping a UB I boat involved breaking the submarine down into what was essentially a knock down kit. Each boat was broken into approximately fifteen pieces and loaded onto eight railway flatcars. In early 1915, the sections of UB-4 were shipped to Antwerp for assembly in what was typically a two- to three-week process. After UB-4 was assembled and launched sometime in March, she was loaded on a barge and taken through canals to Bruges where she underwent trials.

Service career 
The submarine was commissioned into the German Imperial Navy as SM UB-4 on 23 March under the command of Oberleutnant zur See Karl Gross, a 29-year-old first-time U-boat commander. UB-4 soon joined the other UB I boats then comprising the Flanders Flotilla, which had been organized on 29 March. When UB-4 joined the flotilla, Germany was in the midst of its first submarine offensive, begun in February. During this campaign, enemy vessels in the German-defined war zone, which encompassed all waters around the United Kingdom (including the English Channel), were to be sunk. Vessels of neutral countries were not to be attacked unless they definitively could be identified as enemy vessels operating under a false flag.

UB-4 kicked off operations for the new flotilla when she departed on her first patrol on 9 April. The following day, she sank the first ship credited to the Flanders Flotilla. The 5,940 GRT British-flagged , which had been chartered by the American Commission for Relief in Belgium, was headed for Norfolk, Virginia, United States, in ballast after delivering relief supplies to Rotterdam. Despite the fact that the ship had a pass of safe-conduct from Germany, was marked with the words "Belgian Relief" on her side, and was flying a white flag with the same wording, Gross torpedoed the vessel without warning. Harpalyce sank in about five minutes, which allowed no time to launch any of the lifeboats. The Dutch steamers Elisabeth and Constance, and the American steamer Ruby picked up survivors. Herbert Hoover, head of the relief committee, reported that his organization's charter of the ship ended after delivery of the cargo in Rotterdam, but expressed disbelief that the ship could have been the victim of a torpedo attack, given the "distinct assurance" that ships engaged in the relief effort "would not be molested". Harpalyces master and 14 others from the 44-man crew died in the attack. Harpalyce was the largest ship sunk by UB-4 during her career.

Ellispontos was en route to Montevideo from Amsterdam when sunk by Gross and UB-4 on 17 April. Although German U-boats sank over 100,000 tons of shipping in each of May and June, UB-4 did not contribute to those totals. She did add one ship to the 98,000-ton tally for July when she sank the Belgian ship Princesse Marie Jose and her load of coal on 29 July. The 1,954 GRT steamer had sailed from Dunston and was headed to Bordeaux when sunk  from the Shipwash Lightship off Harwich.

Sinking 

According to the website Uboat.net, this attack was likely by UB-4, because she was operating in the area on her fourteenth patrol. Regardless of the identity of Bona Fides attacker, UB-4 did approach a group of smacks in the vicinity the next day, but unbeknownst to UB-4s commander, Gross, one of the fishing vessels was actually a British decoy ship.

The decoy or Q-ship was His Majesty's Armed Smack , a smack that had been outfitted with a concealed 3-pounder (47 mm) gun. Around 20:20, UB-4 drew within  of Inverlyon and Gross, on the conning tower of UB-4, shouted out commands to Inverlyons crew in German. After waiting until the right moment, Ernest Jehan, a Royal Navy gunner in command of Inverlyon, ordered the White Ensign raised and gave the command to open fire. A burst of three rounds from the 3-pounder scored hits on the conning tower, the second destroying part of the bridge and sending Gross into the water. UB-4, with no one at the helm, drifted behind Inverlyon, and when clear, the 3-pounder fired another six shots into the hull of UB-4 at point blank range. All the while small arms fire from Inverlyons crew peppered the submarine. The U-boat began going down by the bow, becoming nearly vertical before disappearing below the surface. A member of Inverlyons crew attempted the rescue of one crewman from UB-4, but was unable to reach him before he went under, meeting the same fate as the other thirteen crewmen.

As UB-4 went down, her hulk fouled the Inverlyons nets—which had been deployed to keep up the appearance of a real fishing boat—essentially anchoring Inverlyon in place. The Q-ship's crew, not having a wireless set on board, sent word of the encounter with another smack, and followed up by releasing messenger pigeons the following morning, requesting instructions on what to do with UB-4. The thought of salvaging the snagged U-boat was rejected, so the nets were cut, freeing UB-4 to sink to the bottom. UB-4s wreck lies at position . Jehan was awarded the Distinguished Service Cross for the sinking of UB-4, and the crewmen of Inverlyon split the submarine bounty paid by the Admiralty.

Summary of raiding history

Notes

References

Bibliography 

 

 
 
 
 
 
 
 

German Type UB I submarines
Ships built in Kiel
Ships built in Belgium
1915 ships
U-boats commissioned in 1915
World War I submarines of Germany
Maritime incidents in 1915
U-boats sunk in 1915
U-boats sunk by British warships
World War I shipwrecks in the North Sea
Ships lost with all hands